Rio Raj is an Indian actor and video jockey, who has appeared in Tamil language films and television. Often working on shows by network Star Vijay, Raj became known for his role on the soap opera Saravanan Meenatchi, before moving to work in Tamil cinema.

Career 
Rio Raj started his career as an actor in Star Vijay's 2013 television drama Kana Kaanum Kalangal Kalloori Saalai, a spin-off of its Kana Kaanum Kaalangal series. He later moved to work with Sun Music as a video jockey, hosting day-time shows such as Kaloorikalam, Suda Suda Chennai, and Free Ah Vidu among others. He later returned to Star Vijay by portraying the lead role in the third season of the drama, Saravanan Meenatchi between 2016 and 2018.

Following a supporting role in Sathriyan (2017), Raj appeared in his first lead role in a feature film through the comedy drama, Nenjamundu Nermaiyundu Odu Raja (2019), produced by actor Sivakarthikeyan. The film opened to mixed reviews, with a critic noting he makes a "decent debut". His next film Plan Panni Pannanum, another comedy drama, was delayed by the coronavirus pandemic. In October 2020, he participated in Bigg Boss (Tamil season 4). He was listed by the Chennai Times as the ninth most "Desirable Man on Television 2020“.

Filmography

Film

-

References

Year of birth missing (living people)
Place of birth missing (living people)
Living people

Bigg Boss (Tamil TV series) contestants
Indian Tamil people
Indian VJs (media personalities)
Male actors in Tamil cinema
People from Erode district
Tamil male actors
Tamil male television actors
Television personalities from Tamil Nadu